The 2020–21 season was the second in the history of Western United Football Club. The club only participated in the A-League after the 2020 FFA Cup was cancelled due to the COVID-19 pandemic in Australia.

Western United finished tenth in their A-League season, forcing them to play in an FFA Cup play-off in the 2021–22 season.

Review

Background
Western United's inaugural campaign had seen the team finish 5th and advance to the 2020 A-League Finals series, where they won the elimination-final against Brisbane Roar with the only goal from a free kick from Alessandro Diamanti. They advanced to the semi-final where they lost 2–0 against Melbourne City.

Pre-season
The club confirmed four player departures on 31 August 2020 which included Valentino Yuel, Thiel Iradukunda, Oskar Dillon, and Patrick Antelmi. The club's first transfer of the season came on 2 October, when Western United signed former Melbourne City winger Lachlan Wales on a two-year deal. In the span of two days on 6–7 December, two players Tomoki Imai and Andrew Durante both extended their contracts by one-year.

On 21 October, Jonathan Aspropotamitis departed the club to join Perth Glory and continue their AFC Champions League campaign. As the club returned to training ahead of the 2020–21 A-League campaign, they signed a sponsorship with Strapit Sports Tape for two A-League seasons. On 11 November, the club confirmed the departure of James Delianov who was injured throughout Western United's entire inaugural season as he signed for Adelaide United the same day. The day after, the club officially announced their kits for the 2020–21 season designed by Kappa.

On 27 November, the club signed Spanish midfielder Víctor Sánchez who made over 300 appearances in Spain's top-flight La Liga including a spell at Barcelona for three years. Western United played their first friendly on 28 November against local A-League rivals Melbourne City where they lost 2–1 in Melbourne in a behind closed doors match.

December
Western United kicked off their season in the A-League for their second campaign against Adelaide United where the match resulted in a 0–0 draw. Their new players included Víctor Sánchez, Lachlan Wales, Nicolas Milanovic, and Ayom Majok.

Players

Transfers

Transfers in

Transfers out

Contract extensions

Pre-season and friendlies

Competitions

Overview
{|class="wikitable" style="text-align:left"
|-
!rowspan=2 style="width:140px;"|Competition
!colspan=8|Record
|-
!style="width:30px;"|
!style="width:30px;"|
!style="width:30px;"|
!style="width:30px;"|
!style="width:30px;"|
!style="width:30px;"|
!style="width:30px;"|
!style="width:50px;"|
|-
|A-League

|-
!Total

A-League

League table

Results summary

Results by round

Matches

Statistics

Appearances and goals
Players with no appearances not included in the list.

Goalscorers

Disciplinary record
The list is sorted by squad number when total cards are equal. Players with no cards not included in the list.

Clean sheets

References

Western United FC seasons
2020–21 A-League season by team

External links